A slavocracy, also known as a plantocracy, is a ruling class, political order or government composed of (or dominated by) slave owners and plantation owners.

A number of early European colonies in the New World were largely plantocracies, usually consisting of a small European settler population relying on a predominantly West African chattel slave population (as well as smaller numbers of indentured servants, both European and non-European in origin), and later, freed Black and poor white sharecroppers for labor. These plantocracies proved to be a decisive force in the anti-abolitionist movement.

One prominent organization largely representing (and collectively funded by) a number of plantocracies was the "West India Interest", which lobbied in Parliament against the abolition of slavery. It is credited with delaying the abolition of the slave trade from the 1790s until 1806–1808, and likewise with respect to emancipation in the 1820s (instead, a policy known as "Amelioration" was formally adopted throughout 1823–1833). The organization succeeded in delaying abolition until the 1830s.

See also
Confederate States of America
London Society of West India Planters and Merchants
Slave Power, a term used by American abolitionists in the 1840s and 1850s to argue that Southern agrarian interests wielded disproportionate political power in the United States
Slavery in Brazil
Sugar plantations in the Caribbean
Maroon (people)
American gentry
Planter class

References

Sources
 B.W. Higman. "The West India Interest in Parliament," Historical Studies (1967), 13: pp. 1–19.
 See the historical journal: Plantation Society in the Americas for a host of pertinent articles.
 Steel, Mark James (PhD Dissertation). Power, Prejudice and Profit: the World View of the Jamaican Slaveowning Elite, 1788-1834, (University of Liverpool Press, Liverpool 1988).
 Luster, Robert Edward (PhD Dissertation). The Amelioration of the Slaves in the British Empire, 1790-1833 (New York University Press, 1998).

Rule by a subset of population
Slavery in the United States
Slavery in the Caribbean
Plantations
Colonialism